Intergalactic FM (IFM) is an online multichannel cult radio station playing 24/7.

List of channels 
The following channels are on Intergalactic FM:

 Cybernetic Broadcasting System
 Disco Fetish: Italo, Disco and Oldschool
 The Dream Machine: Soundtracks and exotica

IFM3 was temporarily discontinued on November 20, 2015, and Murder Capital FM was promoted to Intergalactic FM Main for IFM1. In September 2016 IFM3/ABC was reinstated.

In September 2017, The Garden (space and ambient music) was discontinued.

IFM also has a live video plus audio stream for broadcasting DJ sets.

Slogans 

A selection of current, previous and ad hoc slogans:
 Music Pro Galaxy
 No Station Such Dedication
 Nothing Beyond Our Reach
 Don't Run – We Are Your Friends or We Are Friends
 You Are Not Alone
 We Play This Shit All The Time
 Robots For Robots or Robots4Robots
 Welcome Alien Visitor!

Festivals 

The yearly festivals for Intergalactic FM were held in the Hague on:
 2020, 21–25 May, streaming edition
 2019, 6–9 June
 2018, 17–20 May, 10 year anniversary
 2017, 13–16 April, featuring Magic Waves

See also 
 I-f

References

External links 

Internet radio stations
Mass media in The Hague
Electronic music organizations